Dorie S. Murrey (born September 7, 1943) is a retired American professional basketball player. He was a 6'8" (2.03 m) 215 lb (97½ kg) forward and he played collegiately at the University of Detroit Mercy. He has played in the NBA from 1966 to 1972. He was originally selected with the second pick in the 2nd round of the 1966 NBA draft by the Detroit Pistons. He was taken in two expansion drafts. In 1967 he was made available by the Pistons to be selected by the Seattle SuperSonics, and in 1970 he was made available by the Sonics to be selected by the Portland Trail Blazers. He was traded 3 games into the 1970–71 season, on October 10, 1970, by the Trail Blazers to the Baltimore Bullets in exchange for a 1971 2nd round draft choice (Rick Fisher). During his six-year NBA career Murrey averaged 4.7 points and 4.4 rebounds per game in 357 career games.

Notes

External links
Dorie Murrey NBA stats @ basketballreference.com

1943 births
Living people
African-American basketball players
American men's basketball players
Baltimore Bullets (1963–1973) players
Basketball players from Detroit
Cass Technical High School alumni
Centers (basketball)
Detroit Mercy Titans men's basketball players
Detroit Pistons draft picks
Detroit Pistons players
Portland Trail Blazers expansion draft picks
Portland Trail Blazers players
Power forwards (basketball)
Seattle SuperSonics expansion draft picks
Seattle SuperSonics players
Small forwards
21st-century African-American people
20th-century African-American sportspeople